The Bodil Special Award (Special Bodil) is one of the awards at the annual Bodil Awards presented by the Danish Film Critics Association. While the Bodil Awards as such were established in 1948, the Special Award was first presented in 2008, and has been given annually to a person or an organization who has done something special for Danish cinema.

Recipients 
 2008: Ghost Digital Production House for the effects in Island of Lost Souls
 2009:  for the score to What No One Knows, Terribly Happy, and 
 2010: Kristian Eidnes Andersen for sound design in Antichrist
 2011: Tobias Lindholm for the scripts for R and Submarino
 2012: Distributor Jes Graversen from Miracle Film
 2013: Joshua Oppenheimer for the hybrid film The Act of Killing
 2014: Copenhagen International Documentary Festival headed by Tine Fischer
 2015: , film editor, for editing Nymphomaniac and Nymphomaniac Director's Cut
 2016: Tonmeister Peter Albrechtsen
 2017: Christina Rosendahl for her film work as chairman of the Danish Film Directors
 2018: The Animation Workshop, Copenhagen Bombay, and VOID – International Animation Film Festival
 2019: Translator Henrik Thøgersen
 2020: Stumfilm.dk, the silent movie streaming service of the Danish Film Institute
 2021: Director and Producer Katja Adomeit for her innovation and for bringing New Zealander Daniel Borgman, Swedish Anna Eborn, Afghan Shahrbanoo Sadat, and Danish  to light.

References

External links 
  

Special Award